Mamerto is both a surname and a given name. Notable people with the name include:

Claudio Mamerto Cuenca (1812–1852), Argentine poet and physician
Mamerto Esquiú (1826–1883), Argentine Roman Catholic Bishop of Córdoba
José Mamerto Gómez Hermosilla (1771–1837), Spanish Hellenist, journalist and writer
Mamerto Natividad (1871–1897), Filipino military leader during the Philippine Revolution against the Spaniards
Fabio Mamerto Rivas Santos (1932–2018), Dominican Roman Catholic prelate
Mamerto Urriolagoitía (1895–1974), President of Bolivia from 1949 to 1951

See also
Fray Mamerto Esquiú Department, department of Catamarca Province in Argentina
General Mamerto Natividad, Nueva Ecija, 4th class municipality in the province of Nueva Ecija, Philippines
San Antonio, Fray Mamerto Esquiú, municipality in Catamarca Province in northwestern Argentina
San José de Fray Mamerto Esquiú, town in Catamarca Province, Argentina